J. J. McCracken (born 1972, Mifflin, PA) is an American artist who lives and works in Washington, DC. McCracken creates "sculptures, performances, and immersive installations focused on free speech, social justice and resource equity."

Education
McCracken received a B.A. in Anthropology from The College of William and Mary in 1995, and an M.F.A. in Studio Art from The George Washington University in 2005. Subsequently, she attended the Skowhegan School of Painting and Sculpture.

Artwork 
McCracken has been called "among the smartest artists in Washington" by the Washington Post. Her work, installations and performances has been exhibited and performed in museums, galleries and universities. In 2018, she was one of 10 artists selected for the "Identify" series of performance/lectures at the National Portrait Gallery's "Identify" series.

Exhibitions 

2005 - Solo MFA thesis exhibition -re-performed as part of the Academy 2005, exhibition at Conner Contemporary Art, Washington, DC
2005 - Dissolve, The Dimock Gallery—The George Washington University; Washington, DC
2007 - Artifacts for a New Millennium, Meat Market Gallery; Washington, DC
2007 - A sketch for larger work, Performed at the entrance to KeyArena in Center City STASIS, Meat Market Gallery; Washington, DC
2007 - The Wait (Counting), KeyArena, Seattle, Washington
2008 - Living Sculpture, Project 4 Gallery, Washington, DC
2010 - San Angelo Museum of Fine Arts, San Angelo, Texas
2010 - The Clay Studio, Philadelphia, Pennsylvania
2010 - Earth To Table, The Kathryn E. Narrow Educational Resource Center, The Clay Studio, Philadelphia, Pennsylvania
2011 - Thirst, and the Martyr, (e)merge Art Fair, Capitol Skyline Hotel, Washington, DC
2011 - (e)merge art fair, Washington, DC
2011 - Climate, Control, Civilian Art Projects, Washington, DC
2012 - Renting the Rain, Watershed Center for the Ceramic Arts, Newcastle, Maine
2012 - The archaeologist (the steward), and wonder and study, Smithsonian Institution, Freer & Sackler Galleries, Washington, DC
2012 - The Huntress, (e)merge Art Fair, Capitol Skyline Hotel, Washington, DC
2013 - Siamo Quel Che Mangiamo? Sostenibilita` e arte (Are We What We Eat?), Accademia di Brera, Milan, Italy
2013 - Green Acres, The American University Museum at Katzen Art Center, Washington, DC
2013 - The Unexpected, Max L. Jackson Gallery at Queens University, Charlotte, North Carolina
2013 - Queer Objectivity, Stamp Gallery, University of Maryland, College Park, Maryland 
2013 - A Recursive Lens, Hillyer/International Arts & Artists, Washington, DC
2014 - Husk, Arlington Arts Center, Arlington, VA
2014 - Inciteful Clay, Foosaner Art Museum at the Florida Institute of Technology, Melbourne, Florida
2014 - 40 Years of Community Art, Arlington Arts Center, Arlington, VA
2016 - The Mouth of the Scold (2016), was commissioned by the National Portrait Gallery for the "IDENTIFY: Performance Art as Portraiture" series. Following the performance, McCracken's sculpture, The Dunlevy Medallion, was exhibited in the Gallery's Great Hall.
2017 - Waiting for Godot, Gonzaga University - set features an art installation created by J.J. McCracken and Mat Rude, an assistant professor in Gonzaga’s art department.

References

External links 
Artist's Website

Artists from Pennsylvania
Artists from Washington, D.C.
American performance artists
21st-century American sculptors
American ceramists
Political artists
21st-century American women artists
20th-century American women artists
George Washington University alumni
College of William & Mary alumni
Skowhegan School of Painting and Sculpture alumni
1972 births
Living people
Sculptors from Pennsylvania